Jakub Jaworski (born 29 July 1986 in Bialystok) is a Polish short-track speed-skater.

Jaworski competed at the 2010 Winter Olympics for Poland. In the 1500 metres, he finished fourth in his first round heat, failing to advance. placing 27th overall.

As of 2013, Jaworski's best performance at the World Championships came in 2012, when he placed 19th in the 1500 metres.

As of 2013, Jaworski has not finished on the podium on the ISU Short Track Speed Skating World Cup. His top World Cup ranking is 43rd, in the 1000 metres in 2007-08.

References 

1986 births
Living people
Polish male short track speed skaters
Olympic short track speed skaters of Poland
Short track speed skaters at the 2010 Winter Olympics
Sportspeople from Białystok